The ceremonial county of Somerset, England is divided into 417 areas known as civil parishes, which are lowest unit of local government in England. Parishes arose from Church of England divisions, and were given their current powers and responsibilities by the Local Government Act 1894. The Local Government Act 1972 retained civil parishes in rural areas. Many former urban districts and municipal boroughs were replaced by new successor parishes; urban areas that were considered too large to be single parishes became unparished areas.

The county of Somerset consists of a non-metropolitan county administered by Somerset County Council, divided into four districts and two unitary authorities. The districts of Somerset are South Somerset, Somerset West and Taunton, Mendip and Sedgemoor. The two administratively independent unitary authorities, which were established on 1 April 1996 following the break-up of the county of Avon, are North Somerset and Bath and North East Somerset. These unitary authorities include areas that were part of Somerset before the creation of Avon in 1974.

The city of Bath is the largest centre of population in Bath and North East Somerset. Areas of the city that were formerly within the Bath County Borough are now unparished, but the rest of the authority is divided into 49 parishes. All of North Somerset, the other unitary authority, is covered by its 39 parishes ranging from the village Loxton with a population of 192, to the town of Weston-super-Mare with 76,143 inhabitants.

In 2019 the former districts Taunton Deane and West Somerset (a largely rural area, with a population of 35,712) were merged to form the largest district, Somerset West and Taunton. South Somerset covers an area of 958 square kilometres (370 sq mi) from the borders with Devon and Dorset to the edge of the Somerset Levels. It has a population of about 156,100. The largest settlement in the district is Yeovil, with a population of 30,378. Sedgemoor has 54 parishes ranging in population from Greinton with 71 to Bridgwater with 33,698. The Mendip district covers a largely rural area of 738 square kilometres (285 sq mi), ranging from the Mendip Hills through on to the Somerset Levels. It has a population of about 108,300, living in 62 parishes, the largest of which, Frome has 24,510 residents; the smallest, Sharpham has a population of 71.

History
Parishes arose from Church of England divisions, and were originally purely ecclesiastical divisions. Over time they acquired civil administration powers. The Highways Act 1555 made parishes responsible for the upkeep of roads. Every adult inhabitant of the parish was obliged to work four days a year on the roads, providing their own tools, carts and horses; the work was overseen by an unpaid local appointee, the Surveyor of Highways. The poor were looked after by the monasteries, until their dissolution. In 1572, magistrates were given power to 'survey the poor' and impose taxes for their relief. This system was made more formal by the Poor Law Act 1601, which made parishes responsible for administering the Poor Law; overseers were appointed to charge a rate to support the poor of the parish. The 19th century saw an increase in the responsibility of parishes, although the Poor Law powers were transferred to Poor Law Unions. The Public Health Act 1872 grouped parishes into Rural Sanitary Districts, based on the Poor Law Unions; these subsequently formed the basis for Rural Districts. Parishes were run by vestries, meeting annually to appoint officials, and were generally identical to ecclesiastical parishes, although some townships in large parishes administered the Poor Law themselves; under the Parishes Act 1882, all extra-parochial areas and townships that levied a separate rate became independent civil parishes.

Civil parishes in their modern sense date from the Local Government Act 1894, which abolished vestries; established elected parish councils in all rural parishes with more than 300 electors; grouped rural parishes into Rural Districts; and aligned parish boundaries with county and borough boundaries. Urban civil parishes continued to exist, and were generally coterminous with the Urban District, Municipal Borough or County Borough in which they were situated; many large towns contained a number of parishes, and these were usually merged into one. Parish councils were not formed in urban areas, and the only function of the parish was to elect guardians to Poor Law Unions; with the abolition of the Poor Law system in 1930 the parishes had only a nominal existence. The Local Government Act 1972 retained civil parishes in rural areas, and many former Urban Districts and Municipal Boroughs that were being abolished, were replaced by new successor parishes; urban areas that were considered too large to be single parishes became unparished areas.

Current position

Recent governments have encouraged the formation of town and parish councils in unparished areas, and the Local Government and Rating Act 1997 gave local residents the right to demand the creation of a new civil parish. A parish council can become a town council unilaterally, simply by resolution; and a civil parish can also gain city status, but only if that is granted by the Crown. The chairman of a town or city council is called a mayor. There are currently 28 civil parishes in the county with the status of a town, and one (Wells) with city status. The Local Government and Public Involvement in Health Act 2007 introduced alternative names: a parish council can now chose to be called a community; village; or neighbourhood council.

Bath and North East Somerset
The area of the city of Bath which was part of Bath County Borough is unparished.

Mendip
The whole of the district is parished.

North Somerset
The whole of the district is parished.

Sedgemoor
The whole of the district is parished.

South Somerset
The whole of the district is parished.

Somerset West and Taunton 
Part of the former Taunton Municipal Borough is unparished.

See also
 List of civil parishes in England
 List of ecclesiastical parishes in the Diocese of Bath and Wells

References

Civil parishes
Civil parishes
Somerset

Civil parishes